Matthew Hughes (born 17 July 1992) is an English footballer. He played in the English Football League for Fleetwood Town.

Career
Hughes began his career playing at the Everton academy until he was released in 2012. He played amateur football with Golborne Sports becoming top goal scorer in half a season before joining Skelmersdale United in November 2012. He impressed for the Northern Premier League side and became a prolific goalscorer which earned him a move to Fleetwood Town in January 2014. He made his Football League debut on 22 February 2014 in a 1–0 defeat away at Mansfield Town. He spent two loan spells with Chester during the 2014–15 season, making 26 appearances. At the end of the season, Fleetwood Town announced that they would not be renewing Hughes' contract.

On 30 May 2015, AFC Fylde announced they had signed Hughes on a two year contract.

In August 2017 he moved to Chorley.

In May 2018 he rejoined Chester.

In December 2020 he joined on dual registration terms after a series of bad injuries.

In June 2021 he joined Stalybridge Celtic and was an unused substitute for two Northern Premier League matches before leaving the club at the end September.

References

External links

Matty Hughes at playmakerstats.com (English version of ogol.com.br)

1992 births
Living people
English footballers
Association football forwards
English Football League players
National League (English football) players
Northern Premier League players
Skelmersdale United F.C. players
Fleetwood Town F.C. players
Chester F.C. players
AFC Fylde players
Lancaster City F.C. players
Stalybridge Celtic F.C. players